Brownella Cottage and Grace Episcopal Church and Rectory (also known as Bishop Brown House and the Grace Episcopal Church and Education Building) is a historic church complex at S. Union and Walnut Streets in Galion, Ohio.

The site is significant for its association with Bishop William Montgomery Brown, notable as the first bishop of his communion to be tried for heresy since the Reformation and "'the first of any creed in America to be deposed for heretical teaching'" (according to an obituary).

Description
The complex includes:
the Brownella Cottage, built during 1885-1887 for Brown and his wife, Ella Scranton Bradford, which was the bishop's home until his death in 1937,
the bishop's study, formerly St. Joseph's Roman Catholic Church,
the Brownella carriage house,
Grace Episcopal Church, and
the rectory of the Grace Episcopal Church.

The cottage at least was funded by Cleveland philanthropist Mary Scranton Bradford, "reflecting the Bradford wealth and high style of the 1880s architecture in the United States."

Some part of the complex was built in 1866.

The complex was added to the National Register in 1980.

The buildings are now owned by the Galion Historical Society. The 1887 Brownella Cottage features its original furnishings and is open for tours.  The church is located across the street from the cottage and is available for events.

See also
William Montgomery Brown#Brownella Cottage

Notes

References

External links
 Tours - Galion Historical Society

Episcopal churches in Ohio
Houses on the National Register of Historic Places in Ohio
Queen Anne architecture in Ohio
Gothic Revival church buildings in Ohio
Churches completed in 1866
19th-century Episcopal church buildings
Houses in Crawford County, Ohio
National Register of Historic Places in Crawford County, Ohio
Buildings and structures in Crawford County, Ohio
1866 establishments in Ohio
Museums in Crawford County, Ohio
Historic house museums in Ohio
Churches on the National Register of Historic Places in Ohio
Galion, Ohio